Tobias Akselrod (15 October 1887 in Moscow – 10 March 1938 in Kommunarka shooting ground, Moscow Oblast) was a Russian revolutionary and 1919 member of the Bavarian Soviet Republic.

Life 
Akselrod joined the Jewish Labour Bund in 1905. By 1910 he fled abroad from his exile in Siberia. He started working for the Social Democrat Berner Tagwacht newspaper and was a member of the Zimmerwald Left. In April 1917 he returned from Zürich to Russia on the sealed train with Lenin. After the October Revolution he was head of the press office of the Council of People's Commissars, in April 1918 head of the press office of the Central Executive Bureau of the Bolsheviks (Sovnarkom).

From July 1918 he was head of the Soviet press service in Germany. He stayed out of the November revolution in Copenhagen, returning the 8 December to Germany. On 14 January 1919 he was arrested in Stuttgart, brought to Munich and formally placed under house arrest by Kurt Eisner in the Ebenhausen sanatorium. In April 1919 he became a member of the Action Committee of the Workers and Soldiers Council and an advisory member of the Economics Commission. After the suppression of the Council Republic he was apprehended on 14 May in Tyrol and sent back to Munich, where he was accused and sentenced to 15 years in prison.

At the end of 1919 he was transferred from Munich to Berlin-Moabit prison, in 1920 put under house arrest, and on 6 June 1920 he was able to leave via Stettin to Petrograd. He became editor of the Bulletin of the Communist International (Comintern) for the Russian press, the party organisation of the All-Russian Communist Party (Bolsheviks) and Cultural propaganda (Narkompros) in the Russian Soviet republic. From 1921 to 1922 he was head of the publishing department of the Executive Committee of the Communist International (ECCI).

After April 1922 he was active in Switzerland, Austria and France. He wrote for the L’Humanité (the French Communist Party's newspaper). He returned to Soviet Russia at the end of 1925 and worked as a journalist.

In the course of Stalin's Great Purges he was arrested on 23 December 1937 and sentenced to death on 10 March 1938 for alleged membership in a "counterrevolutionary terrorist organization" by the Military Collegium of the Supreme Court of the Soviet Union and executed the same day.

References 

 Joachim Lilla: Akselrod, Tobias, in: ders.: Staatsminister, leitende Verwaltungsbeamte und (NS-)Funktionsträger in Bayern 1918 bis 1945, URL: verwaltungshandbuch.bayerische-landesbibliothek-online.de/akselrod-tobias (30. Juli 2013).
 Alexander Vatlin: Weltrevolutionär im Abseits. Der Kommissar der bayerischen Räterepublik Tobias Axelrod. Vierteljahrshefte für Zeitgeschichte. Band 62, Heft 4, p. 515–536

1938 deaths
1887 births
Russian Jews
Russian expatriates
Great Purge victims from Russia
Soviet politicians
People of the Russian Revolution
Soviet Jews
Jewish socialists
Soviet journalists
Council communists
Jews executed by the Soviet Union
People of the German Revolution of 1918–1919
20th-century Russian journalists
Members of the Communist Party of the Soviet Union executed by the Soviet Union
Executed revolutionaries